Podpeč pod Skalo is a small settlement northwest of Gabrovka in the Municipality of Litija in central Slovenia. The area is part of the traditional region of Lower Carniola. It is now included with the rest of the municipality in the Central Sava Statistical Region.

Name
The name of the settlement was changed from Podpeč to Podpeč pod Skalo in 1953.

Church
The local church is dedicated to Saint Paul and belongs to the Parish of Gabrovka. It was built in the late 14th century as the chapel of the now ruined Gallenstein Castle. The castle was destroyed during Ottoman raids in the 16th century. The interior of the church was painted three times: around 1420, in the late 15th century, and again in 1539.

References

External links
Podpeč pod Skalo on Geopedia

Populated places in the Municipality of Litija